Shin Kalay is a village in Helmand Province, Afghanistan, in the Nad Ali District. It is inhabited by a Pashtun population of 11,000 and adheres to Sharia Islamic law. The village has recently accomplished high feats in education. Given its political background and ultra-conservative placement, advances in the education of boys and girls is a feat recognized and published by the United Nations Office for the Coordination of Humanitarian Affairs (UNOCHA).

Green Village Schools (GVS), an Oregon-based non-profit organization, has worked over the past fourteen years to construct the most modern educational facility ever established in the region. The school, named after GVS Founder/President Mohammad Khan Kharoti, has a student enrollment of over 1,700 students including over 550 girls. As of 2014, the school has a total of 37 rooms.  There are fourteen classrooms for boys and 10 classrooms for girls.  There is a computer lab, storage room, bathroom facilities and small library for the students to use.

See also
 Helmand Province

External links
 Map of Nad Ali district (PDF)

Populated places in Helmand Province